The eighteenth  series of Warsaw Shore, a Polish television programme based in Warsaw, Poland was announced in  January 2023 and began airing on 19 March 2023. The series was filmed in Radom, Warsaw and Łódź. This is also the first series not to include Jeremiasz "Jez" Szmigiel and Kamil Jagielski after their departures the previous season. It was also the first series to include four new cast members, Angelika Kramer, who had previously appeared on the fourth series of Love Island Polska, Eliasz Zdzitowiecki, Marcin Pastuszka and Piotr Nowakowski.

Cast 
 Aleksandra "Ola" Okrzesik
 Angelika Kramer
 Eliasz Zdzitowiecki
 Lena Majewska
 Marcin "Mały" Pastuszka
 Milena Łaszek
 Oliwia Dziatkiewicz
 Patryk Spiker
 Piotr "Piotrek" Nowakowski
 Michał "Sarna" Sarnowski
 Przemysław "Sequento" Skulski
 Wiktoria "Jaszczur" Robert

Duration of cast

Notes 

 Key:  = "Cast member" is featured in this episode.
 Key:  = "Cast member" arrives in the house.
 Key:  = "Cast member" voluntarily leaves the house.
 Key:  = "Cast member" returns to the house.
 Key:  = "Cast member" leaves the series.
 Key:  = "Cast member" does not feature in this episode.

Episodes

References

Series 18